Nicolae Carnat (born 8 April 1998) is a Romanian professional footballer who plays as a forward for Liga I side CS Mioveni.

Career Statistics

Club

Honours
Sepsi OSK
Cupa României runner-up: 2019–20
CFR Cluj
Liga I: 2020–21
Supercupa României: 2020

References

External links
 
 

1998 births
Living people
Sportspeople from Alba Iulia
Romanian footballers
Romania youth international footballers
Romania under-21 international footballers
Association football midfielders
Association football forwards
Danish 1st Division players
Esbjerg fB players
Liga I players
FC Dunărea Călărași players
Sepsi OSK Sfântu Gheorghe players
CFR Cluj players
FC Rapid București players
CS Mioveni players
Romanian expatriate footballers
Romanian expatriate sportspeople in Denmark
Expatriate men's footballers in Denmark